Coité do Noia is a municipality located in the center of the Brazilian state of Alagoas.

References

Municipalities in Alagoas